Sarah Thomson (born 17 June 1985) is a New Zealand actress, known for playing roles in two series of the Power Rangers franchise, and for her role in New Zealand's longest running soap opera, Shortland Street.

Career
After high school at Glendowie College in Auckland, Thomson moved to Christchurch to film the first sections of the troubled American feature called Meet Me in Miami (then titled My Gardener). Thomson was discouraged from acting by her experiences and returned to her hometown of Auckland to focus on friends and family.

Drawn back to stage, she ended up performing outdoor Shakespeare, as part of the University of Auckland's long-running Summer Shakespeare tradition. She was not a student at this time, but later enrolled to study Film, Television, Media Studies and Theatre Studies. During this time, she filmed her role in Living the Dream, sat on the board of the University Theatre Company and wrote for the University's weekly student publication, Craccum.

In 2006, Thomson was chosen to participate in Auckland theatre company Silo Theatre's new talent project, The Ensemble Project. Along with eleven others (including Barnie Duncan and Bonnie Soper), the participants were prepared for a season of two plays. One of them was an interpretation of 'Tis Pity She's a Whore directed by Michael Hurst, and the other was a company devised piece called Based On Auckland, led by director Oliver Driver. Both works played in the 2008 Auckland Festival.

Thomson appeared as undercover policewoman/nurse Tracey Morrison on New Zealand soap opera Shortland Street from 2007 to 2011. She now writes and performs for the children's puppet television show, The Moe Show, performing and voicing Fern the Fairy. From 2018 to 2021, she was the programme director of New Zealand's largest independent radio station, 95bFM, where she still hosts an afternoon show each Saturday.

In 2021, Thomson moved to NZ On Air in Auckland, where she is the music contracts and funding coordinator. She is also a relief newsreader at Radio New Zealand.

Film work
Meet Me in Miami – Jennifer (2005)

TV work
 The Moe Show – Fern (2014–present)
Power Rangers Jungle Fury – Fran, Lepus (2008)
Alt TV'''s Fresh Produce, The Residents & Lamest Girl Alive – Presenter/Herself (2007–08)Shortland Street – Tracey Morrison (17 episodes, 2007, core cast, 2008–2011)
 Power Rangers SPD – Diane/Hydrax (2005)
 Living the Dream – Tiffany (2004)

Other credits
Alt TV – Station Music Producer (2007–08)Rip It Up, among others – Freelance Music Writer (2011–2015)95bFM'' – ex-Breakfast Producer; ex-Programme Director (2018-2021); Saturday 2–4pm host (2015–present)

References

External links
 

1985 births
Living people
New Zealand film actresses
New Zealand television actresses
New Zealand soap opera actresses
21st-century New Zealand actresses